The Town of Beecher is located in Marinette County, Wisconsin, United States. The population was 783 at the 2000 census. The unincorporated communities of Beecher, Beecher Lake, and White Pine Haven are located in the town.

Geography
According to the United States Census Bureau, the town has a total area of 49.4 square miles (127.9 km2), of which, 48.5 square miles (125.7 km2) of it is land and 0.9 square miles (2.2 km2) of it (1.74%) is water.

Demographics
The most recent data indicates that there are 826 people, 334 households, and 227 families residing in the town of Beecher. The population density was 16.1 people per square mile (6.2/km2). There were 971 housing units at an average density of 20.0 per square mile (7.7/km2). The racial makeup of the town was 94.25% White, 1.15% African American, 1.92% Native American, 0.26% Asian, 0.89% from other races, and 1.53% from two or more races. Hispanic or Latino of any race were 2.17% of the population.

There were 334 households, out of which 22.8% had children under the age of 18 living with them, 59.9% were married couples living together, 5.1% had a female householder with no husband present, and 32.0% were non-families. 26.3% of all households were made up of individuals, and 11.1% had someone living alone who was 65 years of age or older. The average household size was 2.34 and the average family size was 2.81.

In the town, the population was spread out, with 23.5% under the age of 18, 5.1% from 18 to 24, 25.5% from 25 to 44, 29.1% from 45 to 64, and 16.7% who were 65 years of age or older. The median age was 42 years. For every 100 females, there were 98.2 males. For every 100 females age 18 and over, there were 103.7 males.

The median income for a household in the town was $29,107, and the median income for a family was $31,397. Males had a median income of $33,000 versus $19,875 for females. The per capita income for the town was $17,674. About 11.3% of families and 11.9% of the population were below the poverty line, including 16.4% of those under age 18 and 17.4% of those age 65 or over.

Government
Beecher is governed by a town board composed of three representatives, a chairman and two supervisors, all elected at large. Town meetings are held the second Tuesday of each month at the town hall.

Education
Students in Beecher are served by the Pembine-Beecher-Dunbar public school district.

Churches
There are two churches in the town of Beecher both located on US Highway 141: Crossroads Church (an Assembly of God congregation), and Faith Baptist Church.

References

External links
Exploring Pembine and Beecher

Towns in Marinette County, Wisconsin
Marinette micropolitan area
Towns in Wisconsin